Emmanuel Alejandro D'Andrea Yépez (born January 20, 1995) is a professional footballer who plays as a defender for Puerto Rican club Bayamón FC and the Puerto Rican national team.

D'Andrea was born to Venezuelan parents in Caracas, Venezuela. He is of Italian descent through his paternal side. He was living in Puerto Rico since he was a year and a half old. He became an American citizen of Puerto Rico at age 10. Since then, he has triple nationality: Venezuelan, Italian and Puerto Rican.

Club career
D'Andrea played college soccer for Georgia Perimeter College. In 2013, D'Andrea joined the youth ranks of Sevilla FC.

International career
After playing for the Puerto Rico under-20 team, he made his senior international debut for Puerto Rico in 2012.

References

1995 births
Living people
Footballers from Caracas
Venezuelan people of Italian descent
Venezuelan emigrants to Puerto Rico

Puerto Rican people of Italian descent
American sportspeople of Venezuelan descent
People with acquired American citizenship
Puerto Rican footballers
Association football central defenders
Association football midfielders
Puerto Rico international footballers
Tercera División players
Sevilla FC C players
AEC Manlleu footballers
Atlético Onubense players
Puerto Rican expatriate footballers
Venezuelan expatriate sportspeople in Puerto Rico
Expatriate footballers in Puerto Rico
Puerto Rican expatriate sportspeople in Spain
Expatriate footballers in Spain
Italian footballers
Italian expatriate footballers
American people of Italian descent